Paratrachichthys fernandezianus, the Chilean sandpaper fish, is a member of the family Trachichthyidae. It is native to the Desventuradas Islands and the Juan Fernández Islands off the coast of Chile. Despite its relatively limited range, it is listed as least concern by the IUCN because its population is not threatened at present. The Juan Fernández Islands are a marine reserve and the Desventuradas Islands are mostly uninhabited. It can be found between 0m and 20m from the surface of the ocean, also known as the photic zone.

References

External links
 

fernandezianus
Fish described in 1887
Taxa named by Albert Günther
Fish of the Pacific Ocean